Calochortus argillosus is a species of flowering plant in the lily family which is known by the common name clay mariposa lily.

It is endemic to coastal central California, where it grows in hard clay soils in the local mountains.

Description

The inflorescence bears 1 to 4 erect bell-shaped flowers. Each flower has three sepals and three petals up to 4 centimeters long. The petals are rounded in shape and white to pink in base color with a central spot or streaking of red, purple, and yellow.

The fruit is a narrow capsule up to 6 centimeters long.

External links
 
 Jepson Manual Treatment of Calochortus argillosus
 USDA Plants Profile for Calochortus argillosus
 Flora of North America
 UC Photos gallery — Calochortus argillosus

argillosus
Endemic flora of California
Natural history of the California chaparral and woodlands
Natural history of the California Coast Ranges
Natural history of the San Francisco Bay Area
Flora without expected TNC conservation status